"Burning in the Heat of Love" is a song by the British rock band Slade, released in 1977 as a non-album single. It was written by lead vocalist Noddy Holder and bassist Jim Lea, and produced by Chas Chandler. The song failed to make an appearance in the UK charts.

Background
Having returned to the UK from the United States in 1976, Slade found themselves out-of-favour at the time of the UK's Punk rock explosion. The band's 1977 album Whatever Happened to Slade proved a commercial failure while their tour that spring had shown that they could no longer fill large venues. Slade's waning success soon led to the band playing small gigs after that, including universities and clubs. "Burning in the Heat of Love" was released as a non-album single in April 1977, less than a month after Whatever Happened to Slade. It had been recorded in March, and was released prior to the band's upcoming UK tour in May. "Burning in the Heat of Love" failed to chart.

Release
"Burning in the Heat of Love" was released on 7" vinyl by Barn Records in the UK, France, Germany, Belgium and Italy. The B-side, "Ready Steady Kids", was exclusive to the single and would later appear on the band's 2007 compilation B-Sides.

Promotion
In Germany, the band performed the song on the TV show Szene 77. The song also appeared in the band's set-list around the time and a version appear on the band's 1978 live album Slade Alive, Vol. 2.

Critical reception
Upon release, Record Mirror gave the single three out of five stars for what they described as the ""You Really Got Me" guitar riff." In a review of one of the band's 1977 live concerts, Sheila Prophet of Record Mirror said the song was a "reasonable number", but "not a patch on their old stuff".

Formats
7" Single
"Burning in the Heat of Love" - 3:50
"Ready Steady Kids" - 3:57

Cover versions
During 1979-80, Jim Lea would record his own version of the song with his brother Frank as part of his side-project The Dummies. This version of the song, credited only to 'Jim Lea', would first surface in 1985 on the UK/German various artists compilation Metal Killers Kollection. The version would also later be included on the 1992 album A Day in the Life of the Dummies, which gathered The Dummies' recordings.
In 1983, British heavy metal band Girlschool released their own version of the song on their fourth studio album Play Dirty. The entire album was produced by Holder and Lea, and another Slade cover, "High and Dry", was also included on it. Girlschool would release their version of "Burning in the Heat" as a single in January 1984 but it failed to chart.

Personnel
Slade
Noddy Holder - lead vocals, guitar
Dave Hill - lead guitar, backing vocals
Jim Lea - bass, backing vocals
Don Powell - drums

Additional personnel
Chas Chandler - producer

References

1977 singles
1977 songs
Slade songs
Songs written by Noddy Holder
Songs written by Jim Lea
Song recordings produced by Chas Chandler
Song recordings produced by Noddy Holder
Song recordings produced by Jim Lea